Armed Forces Day in South Korea is an annual event usually celebrated on 1 October to commemorate the service of men and women in the Republic of Korea Armed Forces. The day that South Korean forces broke through the 38th parallel in 1950 during the Korean War. It is not a national holiday or public day off, but a National Flag Raising Day (국기게양일) to recognize and honor the Republic of Korea Armed Forces. In 2017, the holiday was celebrated on 28 September rather than the usual date to avoid clashing with the lunar holiday of Chuseok.

References

Observances in South Korea
October observances
Military of South Korea
Armed Forces days
Autumn events in South Korea